Igor Oprea (born 5 October 1969) is a former Moldovan football player.

Playing career
Oprea spent most of his career playing for FC Zimbru Chişinău, winning the Moldovan championship four times and the cup once with the club.

Oprea made 44 appearances for the Moldova national football team from 1992 to 2001.

Managerial career
After he retired from playing, Oprea began working with the Moldova national youth teams, and became a football manager. He led FC Viitorul Orhei in 2009 and 2010.

International goals
Scores and results list Moldova's goal tally first.

References

External links

Profile at KLISF

1969 births
Living people
Moldovan footballers
Moldova international footballers
Moldovan expatriate footballers
CSF Bălți players
FC Zimbru Chișinău players
FC Chornomorets Odesa players
Ukrainian Premier League players
Expatriate footballers in Ukraine
Moldovan expatriate sportspeople in Ukraine
Association football midfielders